is an autobahn in Germany.

The A 831 is one of the shortest autobahns in Germany, measuring 2.3 km and containing two junctions. Originally, the A 831 continued another 15 km to Gärtringen, where an intersection with a planned section of the A 81 would have been located. The A 81 north of Gärtringen was eventually cancelled, leaving a half-finished interchange that is one of the few in Germany that requires traffic to leave from the passing lane. As a result, for consistency, the A 81 took over the A 831's routing up to the Kreuz Stuttgart interchange with the A 8, where it heads west (concurrent with the A 8) to rejoin the original route.

The 2.3 km of autobahn that remained was initially not signed as the A 831. Heading northbound, travelers were told they were on the B 14; those coming from Stuttgart only saw signs for the A 8/A 81 once they passed Stuttgart-Vaihingen. The A 831 was again fully signed in mid-2009.

Exit list

Road continues as the B 14 towards Stuttgart

Road continues as the A 81, B 14 and E 41towards Sindelfingen
|}

External links
 Autobahn Atlas: A831


831